Kérou is a town, arrondissement and commune located in the Atakora Department of Benin.The commune covers an area of 3745 square kilometres and as of 2012 had a population of 37,419 people.

References

Communes of Benin
Populated places in the Atakora Department
Arrondissements of Benin